Kurrat is a German surname. Notable people with the surname include:

Dieter Kurrat (1942–2017), German footballer and coach
Hans-Jürgen Kurrat (born 1944), German footballer, brother of Dieter
Klaus-Dieter Kurrat (born 1955), German sprinter

German-language surnames